James Lamont Hall is a teacher and former professional American football player who played tight end for six seasons for the Green Bay Packers and New Orleans Saints.

NFL career
While playing tight end for the Green Bay Packers and the New Orleans Saints, Hall scored a total of 2 touchdowns, with 127 receiving yards, and 19 receptions in his professional career. In 2006, he decided that he had finished his dream as an NFL player, and retired from the NFL to pursue other career interests and focus on his family.

Post NFL
After finishing up in the NFL, Hall used his Clemson University teaching diploma, teaching Social Studies for many different grade levels. Hall currently teaches at Fort Mill Middle School in Fort Mill, South Carolina.

References

1974 births
Living people
People from York County, South Carolina
American football tight ends
Clemson Tigers football players
Green Bay Packers players
New Orleans Saints players